was a public university in Sasebo, Nagasaki, Japan. The predecessor of the school, a women's school, was established in 1947. In 2008, the school merged with Siebold University of Nagasaki to form the University of Nagasaki.

External links
 Official website 

Educational institutions established in 1947
Public universities in Japan
Universities and colleges in Nagasaki Prefecture
1947 establishments in Japan

ja:長崎県立大学